Markus Alandrus Randle (born July 4, 1991) known professionally as Childish Major, is an American rapper and record producer based in Atlanta, Georgia. He initially rose to fame as the producer of the 2013 Rocko single, "U.O.E.N.O.", which peaked at number 20 on the Billboard Hot 100. He has since shifted into a career as a solo recording artist with his debut mixtape, Woo$ah, being released in 2017 by Empire Distribution. A single off that project ("Supply Luh") was produced by J. Cole and was featured on an episode of the HBO series, Insecure. In September 2019, he released his debut studio album, Dirt Road Diamond.

Childish Major transitioned to becoming a standalone rapper around 2015, before he released his debut studio album, Woo$Ah, in 2017. He is closely affiliated with Atlanta-Baltimore music collective Spillage Village and American record label Dreamville Records, both of which house frequent collaborators JID and EarthGang. Major is an independent artist, releasing music under his own record label Humility City Records.

Early life

Markus Randle was born on July 4, 1991 in Minnesota. He was raised in Edgefield, South Carolina. He grew up as part of a musical family and his mother would sing in his grandfather's church. His father was also a rapper and producer. Randle began producing beats in middle school using a program called FL Studios. He continued making beats into high school and college, eventually dropping out of college to focus on music production.

Career

Childish Major moved from South Carolina to Atlanta, Georgia in 2011 to pursue a career as a record producer. Early on in his time in Atlanta, he worked with acts like Two-9, Rome Fortune, and Spillage Village. Major was also friends with Atlanta-based producer, DJ Spinz, who signed him to his DJ and artist collective, Hood Rich. Hood Rich helped him get his first placement providing the production work for the Rocko song, "U.O.E.N.O.", in 2013. The song featured Future and Rick Ross and peaked at number 20 on the Billboard Hot 100. Various remixes of the song were released with a range of artists providing additional verses, including Kendrick Lamar, ASAP Rocky, 2 Chainz, Wiz Khalifa, Trinidad James, and others. Major also produced songs by Young Jeezy ("Talk That") and Juicy J ("Ain't No Coming Down") among others in 2013.

In 2014, Major began releasing collaborative tracks with rapper Matik Estrada, including "Family Matters." This would culminate in the release of their joint EP, Community Service, in March 2015. That collection featured the song "Keep Running" with a guest appearance from Big K.R.I.T. During this time, Major also provided production work for artists like SZA ("Green Mile"), Big K.R.I.T. ("Wolf on Wall Street"), EarthGang ("Wednesday", "Thursday"), and others.

In July 2016, Major commemorated his 25th birthday with the release of the song "Happy Birthday" featuring Isaiah Rashad and SZA. He later co-produced the title track off of J. Cole's album, 4 Your Eyez Only, which was released in December 2016. In July 2017, Major released the single, "Woo$ah", and followed that with another single, "Supply Luh", in September. The latter song was produced by J. Cole and was featured on a season 2 episode of the HBO series, Insecure. Those two songs (along with "Happy Birthday") were featured on Childish Major's debut mixtape, Woo$ah, released in December 2017 by EMPIRE. In addition to Isaiah Rashad and SZA, the project featured guest appearances from 6lack, DRAM, and Hero the Band.

In 2018, Major appeared on select dates for Big K.R.I.T.'s "Heavy is the Crown" tour and Billie Eilish's "1 By 1" tour. In August of that year, Major released the single, "Know Nothing", which would be featured on the third season of Insecure. In December 2018, he released the song, "Shine". In January 2019, he was one of numerous artists to attend the studio sessions for the compilation album, Revenge of the Dreamers III, which was released in July 2019 by Dreamville Records. The following month, Major began appearing as part of Reebok's "Alter the Icons" advertising campaign, a role he continues to have as of August 2019. Beginning in February 2019, Major began releasing several songs, including "Naan", "Diet", "Good Luh" (featuring Kota the Friend), and "Framed Checks", among others.

In August 2019, Major released three singles, "For You", "Feelings Hurt", and "No Sweat" (featuring Ludacris). Those songs served as the lead singles for his studio album, Dirt Road Diamond, which was released on September 5, 2019. In addition to Ludacris, the album featured guest appearances from Olu (of EarthGang), Tish Hyman, and Buddy.

Discography

Studio albums

Mixtapes

EPs

Singles

Production discography

References

External links
Childish Major on SoundCloud

1991 births
Living people
American hip hop record producers
Rappers from Atlanta
Record producers from Georgia (U.S. state)
Songwriters from Georgia (U.S. state)
African-American record producers
21st-century African-American people